The legislative districts of South Cotabato are the representations of the province of South Cotabato and the urbanized city of General Santos in the various national legislatures of the Philippines. The province is currently represented in the lower house of the Congress of the Philippines through its first and second congressional districts.

Sarangani was last represented as part of South Cotabato in 1995, while General Santos will be represented separately beginning in 2022.

History 

Prior to gaining separate representation, areas now under the jurisdiction of South Cotabato were represented under the Department of Mindanao and Sulu (1917–1935) and the undivided province of Cotabato (1935–1967).

Republic Act No. 4849, enacted on June 18, 1966, created the province of South Cotabato from the southern municipalities of the old Cotabato province. Normally in this time period chartered cities — by virtue of being independently governed — are not enumerated as part of new provinces. However, given that the legality of the plebiscite results which ratified the Charter of the City of Rajah Buayan (Republic Act No. 4413, enacted on June 19, 1965) was still being decided in the courts at the time of R.A. 4849's approval, Section 1 of the said law explicitly listed the City of Rajah Buayan as part of South Cotabato in case it reverted to its former status as the municipality of General Santos, which eventually happened on 29 October 1966 when the Supreme Court nullified the 6 December 1965 COMELEC proclamation declaring the creation of the new chartered city.

Per Section 5 of Republic Act No. 4849, South Cotabato's first separate representative was elected in a special election held on the same day as the 1967 senatorial elections and began to serve starting in the second half of the 6th Congress. When General Santos finally became a city under the same name on June 15, 1968, by virtue of Republic Act No. 5412, it remained part of the representation of South Cotabato in accordance with Section 104 of its city charter.

South Cotabato was represented in the Interim Batasang Pambansa as part of Region XI from 1978 to 1984. The province returned three representatives, elected at-large, to the Regular Batasang Pambansa in 1984.

Under the new Constitution which was proclaimed on February 11, 1987, the province was reapportioned into three congressional districts; each elected its member to the restored House of Representatives starting that same year.

The passage of Republic Act No. 7228 and its subsequent ratification by plebiscite on 11 May 1992 separated South Cotabato's entire third district to create the new province of Sarangani. This automatically reduced the province's representation to two districts. The former third district first elected a representative under the designation Lone congressional district of Sarangani beginning in the 1995 election. 

The signing of Republic Act No. 11243 on March 11, 2019 created a new congressional district for the highly urbanized city of General Santos by separating it from South Cotabato's first district. The city is designated as the "Lone Legislative District of General Santos" in the title of Republic Act No. 11243, but also as the "Third Legislative District of South Cotabato" in the text. However, the city will effectively constitute a lone district, as it does not vote for provincial officials of South Cotabato.

Given that it was already too late for the Commission on Elections to change the old congressional district configuration data in the automated election system in time for the May 2019 polls, COMELEC Resolution No. 10524 was promulgated on April 11, 2019, to delay the elections for both the new lone congressional district of General Santos and the newly reconfigured first congressional district of South Cotabato to a date no less than six months from May 13, 2019. By virtue of COMELEC Resolution No. 10552, the date of elections for the first district of South Cotabato and the lone district of General Santos was set for October 26, 2019.

However, on September 10, 2019, the Supreme Court of the Philippines declared COMELEC Resolution No. 10524 null and void for violating the law, when COMELEC set separate special elections for the reconfigured first district of South Cotabato and the newly-created lone district of General Santos instead of using the new district boundaries in the next regular (i.e., 2022) election, as RA 11243 intended. In the same ruling, the Supreme Court ordered COMELEC to convene a Special Provincial Board of Canvassers to proclaim the winning candidate, Shirlyn L. Bañas-Nograles who garnered 68.55% of the votes cast in the May 2019 election, as the duly elected representative of the 1st Congressional District of South Cotabato, including General Santos. 

The Supreme Court ruling effectively maintains the old district configuration for the 18th Congress, and sets the election of the first separate representative for General Santos to the 2022 elections. By virtue of Republic Act No. 11243, General Santos is designated as Third District of South Cotabato.

On August 20, 2021, House Bill No. 10021 was filed by Representative Ferdinand Hernandez reapportioning the second district, creating a new third district and making General Santos officially a single legislative district separate from the province of South Cotabato. It passed on third and final reading in the House of Representatives on 15 September 2021 and on the Senate on 31 January 2022 with an amendment where the first election for the reapportioned seats will be on 2025. Polomonok, Tampakan and Tupi will constitute the first district, Koronadal, Banga and Tantangan on the second district while Norala, Santo Niño, Surallah, Lake Sebu and T'boli on the third district. The bill lapsed into a law without then President Rodrigo Duterte's signature on June 2, 2022, and was indexed under Republic Act No. 11804 

 1st District 
Municipalities: Polomolok, Tampakan, Tupi
Population (2015): 262,090

1st District 

Municipalities: Polomolok, Tampakan, Tupi
Area: 957.97
Population (2020): 287,082

1987–2022 
City: General Santos
Municipalities: Polomolok, Tampakan, Tupi
Population (2015): 856,536

Notes

2nd District 
City: Koronadal
Municipalities: Banga, Tantangan
Area: 243.42
Population (2020): 330,306

1987–2025 
City: Koronadal (became city in 2000)
Municipalities: Banga, Lake Sebu, Norala, Santo Niño, Surallah, Tantangan, T'Boli
Population (2020):  688,394

3rd District  
Municipalities: Norala, Santo Niño, Surallah, Lake Sebu, T'boli
Area: 906,39
Population (2020): 358,088

1987–1995

Municipalities: Alabel, Glan, Kiamba, Maasim, Maitum, Malapatan, Malungon

Lone District (defunct) 
encompasses present-day provinces of Sarangani and South Cotabato, and the highly urbanized city of General Santos

Notes

At-Large (defunct) 
encompasses present-day provinces of Sarangani and South Cotabato, and the highly urbanized city of General Santos

See also 
Legislative district of Mindanao and Sulu
Legislative district of Cotabato
Legislative district of General Santos
Legislative district of Sarangani

References 

South Cotabato
Politics of South Cotabato